Mordella tantilla is a species of beetle in the genus Mordella of the family Mordellidae, which is part of the superfamily Tenebrionoidea. It was first discovered in early 1891.

References

Beetles described in 1891
tantilla